is a Japanese footballer who plays forward for the Tokyo Verdy in J2 League.

Career

Urawa Red Diamonds
Sakano made his debut for Urawa Red Diamonds in the AFC Champions League group-stage against Chinese Super League side Guangzhou Evergrande on 26 February 2013 in which he came on as a 59th-minute substitute for Márcio Richardes in a match that the Red Diamonds lost 3–0. Sakano then made his J. League Division 1 debut on 2 March 2013 against the reigning champions from the 2012 season Sanfrecce Hiroshima in which he came on as a 73rd-minute substitute for Shinzo Koroki as the Red Diamonds won the match 2–1.

Career statistics

Club
Updated to 19 July 2022.

References

External links 

 Profile at Montedio Yamagata
 

1990 births
Living people
Meiji University alumni
Association football people from Saitama Prefecture
Japanese footballers
J1 League players
J2 League players
Urawa Red Diamonds players
Tochigi SC players
Ehime FC players
Montedio Yamagata players
Matsumoto Yamaga FC players
Tokyo Verdy players
Association football forwards